ABANTIA is a Spanish group specialising in the engineering, planning, development and the execution of complex systems. The group was formed in July 2006 by renaming AGE (Applicaciones Generales Eléctricas), a company formed in 1944 as specialising in electrical and refrigeration installations, and all the subsidiaries companies created as AGE expanded in new activities. In 2009, Abantia has started activities in Italy, Poland, Guatemala, France and Abu Dhabi, and in 2011, in Mexico and Guatemala, El Salvador, Peru, Chile, Qatar. In 2013, Abantia made a bid for phase one of Kuwait’s Shagaya Multi-Technology Renewable Energy Park.

References

Construction and civil engineering companies of Spain
Construction and civil engineering companies established in 1944
Spanish companies established in 1944